The Renfrew County Courthouse is a designated heritage property and operational courthouse in Pembroke, Ontario, Canada.

Original building

The neoclassical complex includes three buildings: the courthouse itself, a registry office and a small jail. The courthouse was built from 1862 to 1866, the registry office from 1862 to 1868, and the jail from 1864 to 1866. As the Confederation of Canada occurred in 1867, the building is referred to as "Confederation-era". The original courthouse was designed by Henry Horsey.

The registry office was built to the fire-prevention standards of the then-Chief Architect of Canada, Kivas Tully, who had an "obsession" with safety.

The sandstone used in the original construction was quarried at nearby Morrison Island.

The County Atlas of 1881 describes the courthouse as "one of the finest in Canada, combining the features of chaste beauty with simple elegance of construction in a degree possessed by few if any others in the country."
The exterior of the registry was re-bricked in the 1980s, and the heritage value suffered.

Designation
The complex is protected under the Cultural Heritage Protocol Agreement the Ministry of Tourism, Culture & Recreation and the Management Board Secretariat (Ontario Realty Corporation). It has not, however, been municipally designated under the Ontario Heritage Act.

2005 expansion
From 2005 to 2007, the building underwent significant heritage restoration. More than half of the original jail has been incorporated into the new facility. The renovation was led by NORR Limited Architects and Engineers.

The new construction used limestone from Guelph, Ontario. It added  to the 18,729 of the preserved historic buildings.

Awards
In 2006, the American Academy of Architects' Academy of Architecture for Justice awarded the courthouse a Certificate of Merit.
In 2009, the courthouse was named "The Office Building of the Year" by the Building Owners and Managers Association of Ottawa. The same association  certified the courthouse as meeting its Building Environmental Standards for the 2008-09 fiscal year.
The Ontario Association of Architecture awarded the courthouse its "People's Choice" and "Design Excellence" awards in 2009.

Contemporary use
The renovated courthouse currently houses both a Superior Court of Justice and an Ontario Court of Justice, using its six courtrooms. It also has "two jury deliberation rooms, two settlement rooms, a victim/witness program office, Crown attorney offices and a secure vehicle drop-off point for in-custody individuals."

References

External links
 Celebration at award-winning Pembroke Courthouse
The Renfrew County Courthouse, winner of the 2009 OAA People's Choice Award
Renfrew County Courthouse  Rejuvenation Project—Ontario Realty Corporation

Government buildings completed in 1866
Buildings and structures in Renfrew County
Courthouses in Canada
Neoclassical architecture in Canada
Pembroke, Ontario
1866 establishments in Canada